Jamie Shaw may refer to:

Jamie Shaw (footballer) (born 1966), Australian rules player
Jamie Shaw (singer), Welsh musician

See also
James Shaw (disambiguation)